Yubeh (also Romanized as Yūbeh; also known as Yūbeh Sa‘dī) is a village in Abshar Rural District, in the Central District of Shadegan County, Khuzestan Province, Iran. At the 2006 census, its population was 333, in 47 families.

References 

Populated places in Shadegan County